Ralph Kerr Maxwell  (20 March 1934 – 25 March 2012) was a New Zealand politician of the Labour Party. After his parliamentary career, he joined New Zealand First.

Early life and family
Maxwell was born in 1934. He married Frances Maxwell in circa 1963 and they had three children.

Political career

Maxwell had a high profile as chairman of the Portage Licensing Trust, one of two Licensing Trusts in West Auckland.

In 1983 he was appointed as Labour's spokesperson for Primary Industries and Horticulture by Labour leader David Lange. Maxwell had a keen interest in agriculture and worked closely with Colin Moyle, who would become Minister of Agriculture in 1984. Maxwell was the Associate Minister of External Relations and Trade and the Associate Minister of Agriculture in 1990.

After parliament
Maxwell moved from West Auckland to Otumoetai after he left parliament. When New Zealand First was formed in 1993, Maxwell joined that party and served on the party executive. He then moved to Paerata near Pukekohe where he worked in real estate.

He supported the formation of a National/New Zealand First coalition (over a Labour/New Zealand First coalition) 1996 general election.

In the 1995 New Year Honours, Maxwell was appointed a Member of the Order of the British Empire, for public services. Maxwell died on 25 March 2012 aged 78. He was survived by his wife and their three children.

Notes

References

1934 births
2012 deaths
New Zealand Members of the Order of the British Empire
New Zealand Labour Party MPs
New Zealand First politicians
Members of the New Zealand House of Representatives
New Zealand MPs for Auckland electorates
Unsuccessful candidates in the 1990 New Zealand general election